Nadezhda Dmitriyevna Zakharova (born 9 February 1945) is a Soviet and Russian former basketball player who competed in the 1976 Summer Olympics.

References

1945 births
Living people
Communist Party of the Soviet Union members
Lesgaft National State University of Physical Education, Sport and Health alumni
Honoured Coaches of Russia
Honoured Masters of Sport of the USSR
Recipients of the Order of Honour (Russia)
Recipients of the Order of the Red Banner of Labour
Basketball players at the 1976 Summer Olympics
FIBA EuroBasket-winning players
Medalists at the 1976 Summer Olympics
Olympic basketball players of the Soviet Union
Olympic gold medalists for the Soviet Union
Olympic medalists in basketball

Russian women's basketball coaches
Russian women's basketball players
Soviet women's basketball coaches
Soviet women's basketball players